In mathematics, racks and quandles are sets with binary operations satisfying axioms analogous to the Reidemeister moves used to manipulate knot diagrams.

While mainly used to obtain invariants of knots, they can be viewed as algebraic constructions in their own right.  In particular, the definition of a quandle axiomatizes the properties of conjugation in a group.

History
In 1943, Mituhisa Takasaki (高崎光久) introduced an algebraic structure which he called a Kei (圭), which would later come to be known as an involutive quandle. His motivation was to find a nonassociative algebraic structure to capture the notion of a reflection in the context of finite geometry. The idea was rediscovered and generalized in (unpublished) 1959 correspondence between John Conway and Gavin Wraith, who at the time were undergraduate students at the University of Cambridge. It is here that the modern definitions of quandles and of racks first appear. Wraith had become interested in these structures (which he initially dubbed sequentials) while at school.  Conway renamed them wracks, partly as a pun on his colleague's name, and partly because they arise as the remnants (or 'wrack and ruin') of a group when one discards the multiplicative structure and considers only the conjugation structure.  The spelling 'rack' has now become prevalent.

These constructs surfaced again in the 1980s:  in a 1982 paper by David Joyce (where the term quandle was coined), in a 1982 paper by Sergei Matveev (under the name distributive groupoids) and in a 1986 conference paper by Egbert Brieskorn (where they were called automorphic sets).  A detailed overview of racks and their applications in knot theory may be found in the paper by Colin Rourke and Roger Fenn.

Racks
A rack may be defined as a set  with a binary operation  such that for every  the self-distributive law holds:

and for every  there exists a unique  such that 

This definition, while terse and commonly used, is suboptimal for certain purposes because it contains an existential quantifier which is not really necessary. To avoid this, we may write the unique  such that  as   We then have

and thus 

and

Using this idea, a rack may be equivalently defined as a set  with two binary operations  and  such that for all 
 (left self-distributive law)
 (right self-distributive law)

It is convenient to say that the element  is acting from the left in the expression  and acting from the right in the expression   The third and fourth rack axioms then say that these left and right actions are inverses of each other.  Using this, we can eliminate either one of these actions from the definition of rack.  If we eliminate the right action and keep the left one, we obtain the terse definition given initially.

Many different conventions are used in the literature on racks and quandles. For example, many authors prefer to work with just the right action.

and

while many others write

Yet another equivalent definition of a rack is that it is a set where each element acts on the left and right as automorphisms of the rack, with the left action being the inverse of the right one.  In this definition, the fact that each element acts as automorphisms encodes the left and right self-distributivity laws, and also these laws:

which are consequences of the definition(s) given earlier.

Quandles
A quandle is defined as a rack,  such that for all 
 

or equivalently

Examples and applications
Every group gives a quandle where the operations come from conjugation:
 

In fact, every equational law satisfied by conjugation in a group follows from the quandle axioms.  So, one can think of a quandle as what is left of a group when we forget multiplication, the identity, and inverses, and only remember the operation of conjugation.

Every tame knot in three-dimensional Euclidean space has a 'fundamental quandle'.  To define this, one can note that the fundamental group of the knot complement, or knot group, has a presentation (the Wirtinger presentation) in which the relations only involve conjugation.  So, this presentation can also be used as a presentation of a quandle.  The fundamental quandle is a very powerful invariant of knots.  In particular, if two knots have isomorphic fundamental quandles then there is a homeomorphism of three-dimensional Euclidean space, which may be orientation reversing, taking one knot to the other.

Less powerful but more easily computable invariants of knots may be obtained by counting the homomorphisms from the knot quandle to a fixed quandle   Since the Wirtinger presentation has one generator for each strand in a knot diagram, these invariants can be computed by counting ways of labelling each strand by an element of  subject to certain constraints.  More sophisticated invariants of this sort can be constructed with the help of quandle cohomology.

The  are also important, since they can be used to compute the Alexander polynomial of a knot. Let  be a module over the ring  of Laurent polynomials in one variable. Then the Alexander quandle is  made into a quandle with the left action given by

Racks are a useful generalization of quandles in topology, since while quandles can represent knots on a round linear object (such as rope or a thread), racks can represent ribbons, which may be twisted as well as knotted.

A quandle  is said to be involutory if for all 
 

or equivalently,
 

Any symmetric space gives an involutory quandle, where  is the result of 'reflecting  through '.

See also
Biracks and biquandles
Laver table

References

External links
  Knot Quandaries Quelled by Quandles - An undergraduate introduction to quandles and another knot invariants
 A Survey of Quandle Ideas by Scott Carter
 Knot Invariants Derived from Quandles and Racks by Seiichi Kamada
 Shelves, Racks, Spindles and Quandles, p. 56 of Lie 2-Algebras by Alissa Crans
 https://ncatlab.org/nlab/show/quandle

Knot theory
Non-associative algebra